The 2019 WAFL season (officially the 2019 Optus WAFL Premiership Season) was the 135th season of the various incarnations of the West Australian Football League (WAFL). The season commenced on 6 April and concluded on 22 September 2019.  defeated  in the Grand Final by 96 points, the club's fourth premiership in six years and fifteenth overall.

Ladder

Finals

Qualifying and Elimination Finals

Semi-finals

Preliminary final

Grand Final

Bracket

See also 
 List of WAFL premiers
 Australian rules football
 West Australian Football League
 Australian Football League
 2019 AFL season

References

External links
 Season results

West Australian Football League seasons
WAFL